Mount Nansen is a prominent mountain, surmounting the steep eastern escarpment of the Eisenhower Range, 17 km (11 mi) south of Mount Baxter, in Victoria Land. Discovered by the British National Antarctic Expedition (1901–04), and named for Fridtjof Nansen, Norwegian Arctic explorer from whom Capt. Scott obtained much practical information for his expedition.

References
 

Fridtjof Nansen
Mountains of Victoria Land
Scott Coast